Reddam House Berkshire is a co-educational, independent school in Wokingham, in the English county of Berkshire. Reddam House provides education for boys and girls aged between 3 months and 18 years. The school is set in 125 acres of wood and open parkland, and is housed in the Victorian mansion of Bearwood. The current principal is Mr Rick Cross. The school has around 670 students and offers day places as well as weekly and termly boarding for all ages.

History

In 1816, John Walter II (1776–1847), owner of The Times newspaper, purchased the 304-acre estate known as "Bear Wood" from the crown estate of King George III, on which the school is now located. By 1822, John Walter had constructed a modest Georgian villa on the exact spot on which the present mansion still stands. In 1865, John Walter's son, John Walter III (1818–1894), also owner of The Times, decided to tear down his father's house and employed the Scottish architect Professor Robert Kerr to design and build a new house at Bearwood. Construction lasted from 1865–1874 and cost £150,000 (£17,200,000 today). The Bearwood Mansion is one of the largest Victorian country houses in England. Nikolaus Pevsner described it as "the climax of country mansions, in its brazen way one of the major Victorian monuments of England". Bearwood has also been described as "a Victorian monument of stone and oak", "a Palace of a Prince of the Press" and "the Second Palace of Berkshire" (after Windsor Castle).

During the Great War (1914–1918), Bearwood was occupied by Canadian soldiers who had been fighting on the Western front. In mid-1915 John Walter V, offered the mansion to the Canadian army as a convalescent hospital. In 1919, John Walter V sold the mansion to Sir Thomas Devitt and Sir Alfred Yarrow, two merchants from London. The two gifted the magnificent mansion and 100 acres of surrounding woods and parkland to the Royal Merchant Navy School.

The Royal Merchant Navy School was established in 1827 in the City of London. Originally called The Merchant Seamans' Orphan Asylum, the purpose of the orphanage was to clothe, care for and to educate children whose fathers were lost at sea. In 1861, the orphanage moved to Snaresbrook were Prince Albert, the Prince Consort laid the foundation stone for the new orphanage. This would be the last public ceremony of its kind performed by Prince Albert before his untimely death just six months later, on 14 December 1861. In 1902, the orphanage was given the title of "Royal" by King Edward VII, and so was renamed the Royal Merchant Seaman's Orphanage. In 1922, King George V ordered that the word "orphanage" be dropped from the name of the organisation, and so it was renamed The Royal Merchant Navy School. In 1921, the school moved to Sindlesham near Wokingham, Berkshire into the Victorian mansion, Bearwood House.

In 1961, the Royal Merchant Navy School became an all-boys school. In 1965/66 the school changed its name to Bearwood College. In 1991, Her Majesty Queen Elizabeth II opened the Bearwood Theatre as Patron of the college, and in 1995 the school became co-educational again.  
Bearwood College faced a period of uncertainty as a protracted legal proceedings threatened its future on the site which was resolved in 2010 at the High Court, London.
Declining student numbers and the cost of maintaining the mansion, boarding houses, school buildings and the estate led to the closure of the college in June 2014.

The school and mansion were subsequently bought by the Reddam House group in 2014, and in 2015 Reddam House Berkshire was established on the site. Reddam House, Berkshire is part of the international portfolio of 27 schools run by the Reddam House group. Reddam House Berkshire has maintained informal links with the Royal Merchant Navy School and Bearwood College alumni association since its creation in 2014 and has invited Old Royals members to various events and services held throughout the school year within the Victorian mansion house and chapel.

Facilities

On-site facilities at Reddam House Berkshire include a chapel, 350 seat professional theatre with conference facilities, 25m indoor swimming pool, gymnasium, 4G Astro turf hockey pitch, 5 netball courts and 4 tennis courts as well as multiple pitches for cricket, football and rugby. There is also the facility to hold sailing, archery, paintballing and climbing within the school grounds.

The theatre was built in 1991 as part of Bearwood College and formally opened by Queen Elizabeth II. It was fully refurbished in 2014/2015 by Reddam House Berkshire upon their purchase of the site. 
The Theatre is used by the school and a wide range of local and community groups, including the annual Opera at Bearwood. Some of The Times Top 100 companies have held business seminars and conferences at the Reddam House Theatre. 
Bearwood mansion has been used as a venue for weddings, anniversaries, birthdays, christenings and other family celebrations. Wedding fairs, business fairs and corporate events, conferences and seminars are regularly held in the formal rooms of the mansion house. Other public events such as car shows, charity races and endurance events have been held in the school grounds. Weddings, Marriage Blessings and Christenings have been held in the chapel adjacent to the mansion house as well as being regularly used by the school throughout the year.

Reddam House Group of Schools 
Reddam House Group was founded in 2000 by former science teacher and businessman Mr Graeme Crawford in Cape Town, South Africa. The group’s motto is Tutem te rebore reddam, meaning I will keep you safe by my strength. The motto has its origins in Scottish history and later folklore, when reputedly Sir Gregan Crawford saved King David I of Scotland from certain death by a stag during a hunting expedition. The monarch’s coat of arms included the stag’s head as a symbol of his bravery. On marrying the king’s wife, the fleur-de-lis was included in his coat of arms.
This emblem has subsequently been adopted by the Reddam House Group and as corporate branding for all of its educational establishments worldwide. Reddam House group is part of Inspired Educational Group which provides financial backing, logistical support, and professional oversight for its schools and educators.

Old Reddamians
 Douglas Chalmers, senior British Army officer
 Lady Kitty Spencer, aristocrat and model
 Megan Aimee Jones, Artist and painter
 Ben Pasternak, founder of Monkey, Inc.

References

External links
 College website
 Profile on the ISC website
 Royal Berkshire history: Bearwood House
 Bearwood College Reviews on Independentschools.com

Boarding schools in Berkshire
Educational institutions established in 1827
Private schools in the Borough of Wokingham
1827 establishments in England